James Carleton Kennedy (born 1963 in Orange City, Iowa) is an American historian. He is the son of E.W. (Bill) and Nella Kennedy. The elder Dr. Kennedy was for years an eminent professor of religion at Northwestern College (Iowa).

Biography 
Kennedy grew up in Orange City, Iowa, a Reformed village with a large portion of the population having roots in Netherlands. His mother is a Dutch-born immigrant.

He studied foreign service at Georgetown University, obtaining his B.S. in 1986, Christian studies at Calvin Theological Seminary in Grand Rapids, Michigan, obtaining his M.A. in 1988, and took his PhD in history from the University of Iowa in 1995.

He performed several jobs in the field of history before becoming an assistant professor of European history and research fellow at the A. C. Van Raalte Institute, Hope College in Holland, Michigan in 1997.

In 2003, Kennedy moved to the Netherlands because he was appointed a professor of modern history (20th century) at the Vrije Universiteit Amsterdam. In 2007 he changed to the University of Amsterdam, where he became a professor of the history of the Netherlands. In 2009 he succeeded professor Piet de Rooy, head of the section of the history of the Netherlands. Between 1 October 2015 and December 2020, Kennedy was Dean of University College Utrecht.

Kennedy takes a special interest in post-war Dutch history. Because of his Christian belief he considers himself a Christian historian although he is reserved to point out how God is guiding human history.

Politically, he characterizes himself as an independent. However, in the presidential campaign of 2004 he was in favor of John Kerry, the presidential candidate of the Democrats.

James Kennedy is married to Simone Kennedy-Doornbos, a local Dutch politician for the ChristianUnion in Amersfoort. They have three children. The Kennedy family is a member of the Reformed Churches in the Netherlands (Liberated), an orthodox reformed denomination.

Bibliography 
Building new Babylon: cultural change in the Netherlands during the 1960s (1995, dissertation), translated in Dutch as Nieuw Babylon in aanbouw: Nederland in de jaren zestig, Amsterdam, Boom, 1995)
History of the Low Countries (New York, Berghahn Books, 1999), adapted translation from the Geschiedenis van de Nederlanden, Hans Blom and Emiel Lamberts, 1993)
 Een weloverwogen dood. De opkomst van de euthanasie in Nederland (Amsterdam, Bakker, 2002) - about the development of euthanasia in the Netherlands
 Bezielende verbanden. Gedachten over religie, politiek en maatschappij in het moderne Nederland (Amsterdam, Bakker, 2009)
 Stad op een berg. De publieke rol van protestantse kerken (Zoetermeer, Boekencentrum Uitgevers, 2010)
 A Concise History of the Netherlands (Cambridge, Cambridge University Press, 2017)
 Aan Het Werk (Amsterdam, Prometheus, 2021)

References 
 Equivalent article on the Dutch Wikipedia

External links 
  dhr. prof. dr. J.C. (James) Kennedy, University of Amsterdam
  Professor James Kennedy new Dean for University College Utrecht, Utrechtcentral.com, 10 January 2015

1963 births
Living people
American Calvinist and Reformed Christians
American columnists
American expatriates in the Netherlands
21st-century American historians
21st-century American male writers
American people of Dutch descent
Calvin University alumni
Walsh School of Foreign Service alumni
People from Orange City, Iowa
Reformed Churches (Liberated) Christians from the Netherlands
Academic staff of the University of Amsterdam
University of Iowa alumni
Academic staff of Vrije Universiteit Amsterdam
Hope College faculty
Historians from Iowa
American male non-fiction writers